List of all the members of the Storting in the period 1913 to 1915. The list includes all those initially elected to the Storting as well as deputy representatives where available.

Rural constituencies

Smaalenenes

Akershus

Hedemarkens

Kristians

Buskeruds

Jarlsberg and Larviks

Bratsberg

Nedenes

Lister and Mandals

Stavanger

Søndre Bergenhus

Nordre Bergenhus

Romsdals

Søndre Trondhjems

Nordre Trondhjems

Nordlands

Tromsø

Finmarkens

Urban constituencies

Fredrikshald

Sarpsborg

Fredrikstad

Moss and Drøbak

Kristiania

Lillehammer, Hamar, Gjøvik and Kongsvinger

Drammen

Kongsberg and Hønefoss

Horten

Tønsberg

Larvik and Sandefjord

Brevik and Holmestrand

Porsgrund

Skien

Kragerø

Risør

Arendal and Grimstad

Kristiansand

Flekkefjord

Stavanger

Haugesund

Bergen

Aalesund and Molde

Kristiansund

Trondhjem and Levanger

Bodø and Narvik

Tromsø

Hammerfest, Vardø and Vadsø

External links
 Norwegian social science data service

 
Parliament of Norway, 1913–15